"The Caddy" is the 122nd episode of NBC sitcom Seinfeld. This was the 12th episode for the seventh season, originally airing on January 25, 1996. In this episode, George takes an unapproved vacation, leading to him being presumed dead, while Kramer, Jerry, and Jackie Chiles launch a lawsuit against Elaine's archenemy Sue Ellen Mischke because she was wearing a bra without a top in public.

Plot
Kramer's caddie, Stan, helps him improve his golf game and offers other life advice. George locks his keys in his car at work and postpones moving it until he can get locksmith services free through a club membership, knowing this will lead Mr. Wilhelm and George Steinbrenner to think he's working long hours and consider promoting him to assistant to the general manager. Despite this, George goes on an unapproved vacation, telling Jerry to remove any fliers attached to his windshield so Wilhelm and Steinbrenner will still think he's working.

Elaine encounters Sue Ellen Mischke, a high school friend-turned-nemesis and heiress to the Oh Henry! candy bar fortune. Repulsed that Sue Ellen never wears a bra despite her extremely large breasts, Elaine gives her a bra as a birthday gift as a subtle message. Sue Ellen swings by Elaine's office to thank her for the bra, only to notice that Sue Ellen is wearing it alone as a top beneath an open blazer. Peterman, upon seeing Sue Ellen, is inspired to create a bra as a top, assigning Elaine to write the ad copy.

Finding George's car covered by bird droppings, Jerry has Kramer break into the car so they can take it to a car wash. On the drive back, they are distracted by bra-clad Sue Ellen and crash. As a result, Jerry, not thinking clearly, returns the wrecked car to George's workplace. Finding the car in its wrecked state, with blood from the accident, Mr. Wilhelm deduces that George has been in a terrible accident. After scavenging the stadium, Steinbrenner concludes that he is dead and travels to George's parents' house to break the news, although his father is far more upset that Steinbrenner previously traded Jay Buhner while he was still a Yankees prospect for Ken Phelps. Jerry gets a phone message from the Costanzas about George's death, and tells George what happened, who promptly returns to work, with fake injuries and a story of being trapped in a ditch and surviving off grubs and puddle water (in addition to thinking up a deal to bring in Ken Griffey Jr. and Barry Bonds without giving up much). Steinbrenner accepts his story, but informs him the position of assistant to the general manager was given to someone else when he was thought to be dead. Frustrated, George tosses his prop crutches aside and walks away while Steinbrenner assures him that he still has his old job.

Kramer, under Elaine and Stan's advice, takes Sue Ellen to court for damages, with Jackie Chiles representing him. Jerry is smitten with Sue Ellen, but reluctantly testifies that she was wearing only the bra at the time of the accident. All seems to be going to plan, until Stan urges Kramer to get Sue Ellen to try on the bra. Jackie objects to this, but Kramer persuades him to go through with the request. The judge orders her to try it on, but since she is already wearing a leotard, the bra will not fit, costing Kramer the lawsuit.

Elaine's writeup makes the bra-as-a-top a hit, even among her female coworkers, to Elaine's disgust.

Production
Phil Morris was surprised that his character Jackie Chiles was being used in another episode, later commenting, "I mean, how often can they bring an attorney into this mix?" Like the season six episode "The Big Salad", the Chiles plot thread satires the O. J. Simpson murder case, in particular the prosecution asking Simpson to try on the gloves used in the murder and the defense's argument that Simpson was not physically fit enough to have committed the murder.

Jerry Seinfeld later said that Frank Costanza's phone message ("Jerry, this is Frank Costanza. Mr. Steinbrenner's here. George is dead. Call me back.") is one of his favorite lines in the entire series.

References

External links

Seinfeld (season 7) episodes
1996 American television episodes